Ali-Azouz Mathlouthi (born 22 April 1987) is a French professional footballer who played as a striker.

Career 
Mathlouthi began his career at Strasbourg. He was promoted to the first team in 2006. He joined Châteauroux on loan in July 2007. After twelve months, he returned to Strasbourg. He left Strasbourg, again on loan, on 19 January 2009 to join Racing de Ferrol, of the Spanish third division. The player returned at the end of the season.

Personal life
Born in France, Mathlouthi is of Tunisian descent.

References

External links
 
 
 

1987 births
Living people
Association football forwards
French footballers
French sportspeople of Tunisian descent
RC Strasbourg Alsace players
LB Châteauroux players
Racing de Ferrol footballers
AC Arlésien players
RC Lens players
Club Africain players
ÉFC Fréjus Saint-Raphaël players
SC Schiltigheim players
FC Mulhouse players
Ligue 2 players
Championnat National players
Segunda División B players
French expatriate footballers
French expatriate sportspeople in Spain
Expatriate footballers in Spain